Windimoto is an American dance music production duo based in Chicago that consists of DJ/producer Sean Haley and musician/producer Scorpeze.

History 
Windimoto was formed in Chicago in 2007 by Sean Haley and Scorpeze (commonly known as Scorp). Haley and Scorp met in Chicago in the fall of 2005. Upon getting to know each other, they discovered that they had similar musical tastes and ideas. They decided to collaborate on original material and were pleased with the results. Haley and Scorp decided to continue on as a production team.

Haley was born and raised in Chicago and Scorpeze was born and raised in Detroit. The name Windimoto was chosen by Haley to represent both cities. Windimoto's music is based in deep house, a subgenre of house music that is built on mixing electronic production with organic instruments and sounds. Despite that, their music spans several genres. The duo prefer to describe their music as "Dance Fusion".

"Don't Let Me Leave Alone" and The Travels of Windimoto (2007-2009) 
In the winter of 2007, Bay Area hip-hop label Interdependent Media released the duo's debut EP, The Travels Of Windimoto, to critical acclaim. The EP featured five original songs and remixes by Nicolay, Trackademics, Sevany2, and DJ Tony Tone. The first single from the EP was "Don't Let Me Leave Alone" featuring vocals by emcee/singer Phonte Coleman (Little Brother, The Foreign Exchange) under the alias Victor St. Clair. Coleman's involvement was meant to be kept secret in order to let the song succeed own its own merits. The secret was revealed by a journalist in a review of the EP. The Travels Of Windimoto was named #44 in Vapors Magazine's Top 50 Albums of 2008. A remix single for "Don't Let Me Leave Alone" was released in 2009 on the Phuture Soul Recordings label featuring remixes by influential Deep House producers Pirahnahead, Abicah Soul, and Ian Friday.

Sinister Beauty and Beauty Within (2009-2011) 
In 2009, Windimoto released their first full-length album, Sinister Beauty. The album was released on the duo's own label, Windimoto Music. Sinister Beauty was followed in early 2011 by Beauty Within: Sinister Beauty Reimagined, an album of remixes of songs from the Sinister Beauty album along with four new tracks. During this period, Windimoto released a Detroit techno track titled "Friday Night: UBQ" on the Generator Records compilation Broadcast in Hi-Tech. The duo also remixed "Into Your Story" by Sandman featuring Jeremy Ellis. In fall of 2011, the duo released the single "Tonight, We Fly" to introduce their next studio album.

Side projects and Love, Lust, Charm & Passion (2011-present) 
In spring of 2011, the duo returned to the studio to begin work on their next album. Sessions were temporarily halted so that Haley could complete his solo album, RONIN: The Journey of the Lost Warrior, which was released in August of that year. When the duo resumed work on the album, further delay was caused by a hard drive crash. The duo decided to start releasing side projects in place of the delayed studio album. Recording of the album was completed in Spring 2012 and mixing began. Haley released "Moonscape", a single from his solo album. Scorp remixed Haley's song "Fallen" for the Moonscape single. Haley then formed the duo Deep Rooted with fellow DJ and producer Sean Owens. Deep Rooted released a double A sided single "Now Is The Time" b/w "Love For Real". Plans were made for a Deep Rooted album to follow the single. Haley released a single with Cordell Johnson titled "Southside Afrikan". Scorpeze's remix of "Southside Afrikan" was included on the single. Scorp formed the duo The Conversation with producer tREBLEFREE. The Conversation released a remake of a Gary Bartz' rare groove classic "Music Is My Sanctuary", and a remake of Rasa's When Will The Day Come on the b-side. Haley remixed "Music Is My Sanctuary" for the single release. Scorp released "Get Ready" as collaboration with vocalist Nina Rae. Haley's remix of "Get Ready" served as the b-side of the single. During mixing of the new Windimoto album, the duo released a non-album single titled "Transistor", with another non-album track titled "Innerworld" on the b-side. After many rounds of mixing sessions, the album was completed in September 2013. The new album was titled Love, Lust, Charm & Passion and released that November.

Windimoto Music (record label) 
Windimoto founded Windimoto Music in 2008 as a way to better control how their music is marketed and promoted. Originally intended for Windimoto releases exclusively, the label eventually began to release music by other artists.

Discography 
Albums:
 Sinister Beauty (2009, Windimoto Music)
 Beauty Within: Sinister Beauty Reimagined (2011, Windimoto Music)
 Love, Lust, Charm & Passion (2013, Windimoto Music)

EPs:
 The Travels Of Windimoto (2007, Interdependent Media)

Singles:
 "Don't Let Me Leave Alone" / "A Place For Us" (2007, Interdependent Media)
 "Don't Let me Leave Alone" - The Phuture Soul Remixes (2009, Phuture Soul Recordings)
 "Tonight, We Fly" (2011, Windimoto Music)
 "Transistor" / "Innerworld" (2013, Windimoto Music)

References

External links 
 Official website
 Potholes In My Blog review of Sinister Beauty
 PopMatters review of The Travels Of Windimoto
 Okayplayer review of The Travels Of Windimoto
 URB Magazine review of The Travels Of Windimoto

American dance music groups
American house music groups
Musical groups from Chicago
Musical groups from Detroit
Electronic music groups from Illinois